The 2022–23 Mercer Bears men's basketball team represented Mercer University in the 2022–23 NCAA Division I men's basketball season. The Bears, led by fourth-year head coach Greg Gary, played their home games at Hawkins Arena in Macon, Georgia as a member of the Southern Conference.

Previous season
The Bears finished the 2021–22 season 16–17, 8–10 in SoCon play to finish in seventh place. They defeated Western Carolina in the first round of the SoCon tournament, before losing to Furman in the quarterfinals.

Roster

Schedule and results

|-
!colspan=12 style=""| Exhibition

|-
!colspan=12 style=""| Non-conference regular season

|-
!colspan=12 style=""| SoCon regular season

|-
!colspan=9 style=| SoCon tournament

Sources

References

Mercer Bears men's basketball seasons
Mercer Bears
Mercer Bears men's basketball
Mercer Bears men's basketball